Lin Shaohua (born 1952) is a Chinese translator and author. He is a translator in China who translated the works of Haruki Murakami's into Chinese language.

Biography
Lin was born in Jiutai, Jilin, with his ancestral home in Penglai, Shandong. After meddle school, he worked in the countryside as a farmer before the Cultural Revolution. He received his MA degree from Jilin University in 1982, majoring in Japanese language.

From 1982 to 1993, Lin taught Japanese language in Jinan University with his wife, and during 1993 to 1996, Lin taught in Nagasaki Prefectural University. In 1999, Lin was transferred from Xiamen to Qingdao where he was appointed as a professor.

Works

Translations
 Hear the Wind Sing
 Pinball, 1973
 A Wild Sheep Chase
 Hard-Boiled Wonderland and the End of the World
 Norwegian Wood
 Dance Dance Dance
 South of the Border, West of the Sun
 The Wind-Up Bird Chronicle
 Sputnik Sweetheart
 Kafka on the Shore
 After Dark
 A Slow Boat to China
 Firefly
 The Elephant Vanishes
 The Silence
 Kokoro (Natsume Sōseki)
 Rashomon (Ryunosuke Akutagawa) )
 The Temple of the Golden Pavilion (Yukio Mishima)
 The Sound of Waves (Yukio Mishima)
 The Decay of the Angel (Yukio Mishima)
 Socrates in Love (Kyoichi Katayama)
 The Dancing Girl of Izu (Yasunari Kawabata)
 Snow Country (Yasunari Kawabata)

Proses
 The Beauty of the Fallen Flowers
 Nostalgia and Conscience

References

1952 births
Writers from Changchun
Jilin University alumni
People's Republic of China translators
Living people
Japanese–Chinese translators
Academic staff of Jinan University
20th-century Chinese translators
21st-century Chinese translators
Educators from Jilin